Alejandro González Malavé  (May 20, 1957 in San Juan, Puerto Rico – April 29, 1986 in Bayamón, Puerto Rico) was a Puerto Rican undercover agent who gained infamy with the Cerro Maravilla case scandal. In 1973, still a High School student, Malavé was recruited as an undercover agent.

González, an outspoken university political leader, graduated as a police officer in 1979, the same year he went to work undercover. He infiltrated an organization of radical pro independence students and was the driver when Carlos Soto Arriví and Arnaldo Darío Rosado were murdered during a police set up at Cerro Maravilla.

When the Cerro Maravilla inquest was televised all over Puerto Rico González, one of the accused, gained wide fame all across the island. His face became a common sight on Puerto Rican newspaper covers, and he received constant air time on television, because he had to take the stand many times during the trial. Although the scandal played a role in squashing the reelection plans of Governor Carlos Romero Barceló, the alleged conspiracy was never proven. González was tried, but acquitted on all charges.

On the evening of April 29, 1986, just two months after his acquittal, González was assassinated in front of his mother's house in Bayamón. He received three gunshot wounds while his mother was slightly injured. A few hours later, a group calling itself the "Volunteer Organization for the Revolution" called local news agencies claiming responsibility. In their statements they swore to kill, "one by one", all the police officers involved in the deaths in Cerro Maravilla.

See also
List of Puerto Ricans

References

1958 births
1986 deaths
1986 murders in Puerto Rico
Deaths by firearm in Puerto Rico
Male murder victims
People from San Juan, Puerto Rico
People murdered in Puerto Rico
Puerto Rican law enforcement personnel
Puerto Rican police officers